Pwapwa (Poapoa) is a nearly extinct Kanak language of New Caledonia, in the commune of Voh.

References

New Caledonian languages
Languages of New Caledonia
Severely endangered languages